Clinton Street/Southeast 12th Avenue station is a MAX Orange Line station located at 1229 Southeast Gideon Street in Portland, Oregon's Hosford-Abernethy neighborhood, in the United States. The sculpture Intersection is installed at the station.

Bus service 
, this station is served by the following bus lines:
9–Powell Blvd
17–Holgate/Broadway
70-12th/NE 33rd Ave

References 

2015 establishments in Oregon
Hosford-Abernethy, Portland, Oregon
MAX Light Rail stations
MAX Orange Line
Railway stations in the United States opened in 2015
Railway stations in Portland, Oregon